Ranma ½ is a Japanese manga series written and illustrated by Rumiko Takahashi. Published by Shogakukan, it was serialized in Weekly Shōnen Sunday magazine from August 1987 to March 1996. The story revolves around a teenage boy named Ranma Saotome who has trained in martial arts since early childhood. As a result of an accident during a training journey, he is cursed to become a girl when splashed with cold water, while hot water changes him back into a boy. Throughout the series Ranma seeks out a way to rid himself of his curse, while his friends, enemies and many fiancées constantly hinder and interfere.

Shortly after serialization began, Shogakukan began collecting the chapters into tankōbon format. 38 volumes were released between April 1988 and June 1996, just three months after the final chapter was serialized in Weekly Shōnen Sunday. Between April 2002 and October 2003, Shogakukan re-released Ranma ½ in a 38 volume shinsōban edition, with new cover art. A B6-sized edition of the series was published in 20 volumes between July 2016 and January 2018.

In the early 1990s, Viz Media licensed Ranma ½ for English release in North America. They published the manga in a monthly comic book format that contained two chapters each issue from June 1992 to 2003; the last being Part 12, Issue 1. Their English release "flipped" the images to read left-to-right, causing the art to be mirrored. Viz also periodically published the chapters into a graphic novel format, similar to the Japanese tankōbon, with 21 volumes released between May 1993 and January 2003.

Having earlier ceased publication of all manga in the comic book format, Viz posted a press release on March 18, 2004 announcing that they were changing their graphic novel format and would reprint all earlier volumes to match. However, the reprints of Ranma ½ actually began in 2003. Starting with volume 22, the content of this "second edition" remained the same, with mirrored art, but moved to a smaller format with different covers and a price drop. The 36th and final volume was released on November 14, 2006. In 2013, Viz Media announced that they would be re-releasing Ranma ½ in a "2-in-1 edition" that combines two individual volumes into a single large one. For the first time in English, this edition restores the original art and right-to-left reading order. 19 volumes were released between March 11, 2014 and March 14, 2017.

Tankōbon edition

1993 English release

2014 English Release (2-in-1 Edition)

References

External links
 Ranma ½ at Shōnen Sunday Museum 
 Ranma ½ at Viz Media

chapters
Ranma 1 2